is a railway station in Imajuku-ekimae 1-chome, Nishi-ku, Fukuoka City, Fukuoka Prefecture, Japan. The station is operated by JR Kyushu and is on the Chikuhi Line.

Lines
Local and weekday rapid services on the Chikuhi Line stop at this station.

Station layout 
The station consists of an island platform serving two tracks at grade. Sidings branch off the main tracks on either side. The station building is of traditional Japanese design with a tiled roof. It houses a waiting area, a kiosk and a staffed ticket window. Access to the island platform is by means of two footbridges, one of which is fitted with elevators.

Management of the station has been outsourced to the JR Kyushu Tetsudou Eigyou Co., a wholly owned subsidiary of JR Kyushu specialising in station services. It staffs the ticket counter which is equipped with a Midori no Madoguchi facility.

Platforms

Adjacent stations

History
In the third phase of expansion, the line was extended further east with  opening as the new eastern terminus on 15 April 1925. On the same day, Imajuku was opened as an intermediate station on the new track. When the Kitakyushu Railway was nationalized on 1 October 1937, Japanese Government Railways (JGR) took over control of the station and designated the line which served it as the Chikuhi Line. With the privatization of Japanese National Railways (JNR), the successor of JGR, on 1 April 1987, control of the station passed to JR Kyushu.

Passenger statistics
In fiscal 2016, the station was used by an average of 5,165 passengers daily (boarding passengers only), and it ranked 36th among the busiest stations of JR Kyushu.

Environs
Nishi ward office Imajuku branch office
Fukuoka-Nishi Police Station
Imajuku InterChange (Fukuoka-Maebaru Expressway)

See also
 List of railway stations in Japan

References

External links
Imajuku Station (JR Kyushu)

Railway stations in Japan opened in 1925
Chikuhi Line
Railway stations in Fukuoka Prefecture
Stations of Kyushu Railway Company